Nemotelus nigrinus, the all-black snout, is a Holarctic species of soldier fly.

Description
A small species (4.0 to 4.8.mm). Cubital vein (R 4+5) unforked. Body all black, without any pale pattern. Frons without any white spots. The distance from the base of the antennae to the tip of the rostellum is greater than the distance from the antennal base to the commencement of the narrow part of the frons. Median outgrowths of hypandrium and outgrowth of basal segment of gonopodites are absent. Aedeagus with two basal projections at a right angle to the plane of aedeagus

Biology
The flight period is May to July. Habitats are fens and marshes, flower meadows and flower rich grassland.

Distribution
North and Central Europe, North and South USSR, Caucasus, Siberia, Central Asia, Mongolia, North America.

References

Stratiomyidae
Diptera of Europe
Insects described in 1817
Taxa named by Carl Fredrik Fallén